Laal Ishq (Cursed Love) was an Indian Hindi romantic horror television series that aired on &TV. The series premiered on 23 June 2018 under the production of Jaasvand Entertainments. It is produced by Anshuman Pratap Singh, Sachin Mohite, Sridhar Makhija, Darpan Patel and Ravi Raj.

Plot
The romantic horror series is about the mysterious life and events of couples. Every episode starts with a new couple. The show focuses on the never-ending love of the couples, even after their death. It also shows love triangle stories with supernatural suspense.

Cast
Each episode starts with a new cast.

See also
 List of Hindi horror shows

References

External links
 

Indian horror fiction television series
&TV original programming
2018 Indian television series debuts
Hindi-language television shows
Indian anthology television series
2010s Indian television series
2020 Indian television series endings